Aposeris is a genus of flowering plants in the family Asteraceae.

There is only one known species, Aposeris foetida, widespread across much of Europe.

The name was first coined by Necker in 1790, but all names in that publication have been declared rejected. Therefore Cassini's 1827 usage is considered the validation of the name. Cassini did not, however, did not validly republish Necker's species name, so Lessing is credited with the formal recombination

References

External links

Monotypic Asteraceae genera
Cichorieae
Flora of Europe